Modern Day City Symphony is the first studio album by the Swedish hip hop band Looptroop. It was released in April 2000 by Burning Heart Records and is entirely produced by Embee.

Track listing
"Intro" (ft. DJ Noise) - 1:23
"Zombies" - 5:14
"Ambush in the Night" - 4:33
"Adrenaline Rush" - 3:30
"Long Arm of the Law" - 5:19
"Fever" (ft. Freestyle) - 5:02
"Focus" (ft. Freestyle) - 4:04
"Business & Pleasure" - 3:34
"Hated by Everyone" - 4:07
"Heed This Warning" (ft. Freestyle) - 3:47
"In the Place to Be" (ft. Kekke Kulcha) - 4:49
"Thief" - 5:18
"Reclaim the City" (ft. Timbuktu) - 4:15
"Interlude" - 0:56
"A Modern Day City Symphony" - 4:26

External links 
 
 

2000 albums
Burning Heart Records albums